Below are the squads for the 2013 EAFF Women's East Asian Cup tournament, held in South Korea on from 20 to 27 July 2013.



|-
! colspan="9"  style="background:#b0d3fb; text-align:left;"|
|- style="background:#dfedfd;"

|-
! colspan="9"  style="background:#b0d3fb; text-align:left;"|
|- style="background:#dfedfd;"

|-
! colspan="9"  style="background:#b0d3fb; text-align:left;"|
|- style="background:#dfedfd;"

References

EAFF E-1 Football Championship squads (women)